Neuropsychologia is a peer-reviewed scientific journal that focuses on cognitive neuroscience. It was established in 1963, and is published by Elsevier (formerly Pergamon Press). The editor-in-chief is Stephan Hamann.

References

External links 
 

Elsevier academic journals
English-language journals
Publications established in 1963
Neuroscience journals
Cognitive science journals
Journals published between 13 and 25 times per year